Lucien Petipa (22 December 1815 – 7 July 1898) was a French ballet dancer in the early 19th century (Romantic period), who was the brother of Marius Petipa, the famous ballet master of the Russian Imperial Ballet. He was born in Marseilles and died in Versailles.

The son of Jean-Antoine Petipa, he was the original interpreter of many of the principal male roles during the Romantic era, working with choreographers such as Jean Coralli among others. Probably the most known role he created was Albert, duke of Sliesa (later to be known as count Albrecht) in the two-act ballet of Giselle in 1841, opposite the Italian-born ballerina Carlotta Grisi for whom the ballet was created. Between 1860 and 1868 he was maître de ballet at the Paris Opera and between 1872 and 1873 he ran the La Monnaie theater in Brussels.

Notable roles
 Albert in Giselle (1841)
 Achmed in La Péri (1843)

Ballets
 In 1857 Lucien Petipa staged a ballet to the music of the second version of the opera Le cheval de bronze.
Sacountala (performed on July 14, 1858 at the Paris Opera)
Graziosa (performed on March 25, 1861 at the Paris Opera)
Le Roi d'Yvetot (performed on December 28, 1865 at the Paris Opera)
Le Marché des innocents (The March of the Innocents), along with his brother Marius Petipa (October 14, 1872, performed in Brussels)
Namouna (performed on February 10, 1882 at the Paris Opera)

References

French ballet masters
Russian ballet
19th-century French ballet dancers
French male ballet dancers
French choreographers
Dance directors of La Monnaie
Entertainers from Marseille
1815 births
1898 deaths
Petipa
Paris Opera Ballet artistic directors
Royal Conservatory of Brussels alumni